Asena Rokomarama (born May 1, 1996) is a Fijian rugby sevens player. She was selected as a member of the Fiji women's national rugby sevens team to the 2016 Summer Olympics.

References

External links

 

1996 births
Living people
Rugby sevens players at the 2016 Summer Olympics
Olympic rugby sevens players of Fiji
Fiji women's national rugby league team players
Fiji international rugby sevens players
Fijian female rugby league players
Fijian female rugby union players
Fiji international women's rugby sevens players